In Sethian Gnosticism, Astaphaios is an archon. In On the Origin of the World, he is one of the three sons of Yaldabaoth, with the other two being Yao and Eloai. In the Apocryphon of John, he is the third of the seven archons.

See also
Astanphaeus

References

Gnostic deities